The omega meson is a flavourless meson formed from a superposition of an up quark–antiquark and a down quark–antiquark pair. It is part of the vector meson nonet and mediates the nuclear force along with pions and rho mesons.

Properties 

This can be shown by deconstructing the wave function of the  into its component parts.
 ,
 ,

where
  is the nonet mixing angle,
  and
 .

The mixing angle at which the components decouple completely can be calculated to be , which almost corresponds to the actual value calculated from the masses of 35°. Therefore, the  meson is nearly a pure symmetric - state.

See also
 List of mesons
 Quark model
 Vector meson

References

Mesons
Onia
Subatomic particles with spin 1